The Boulogne-Billancourt Half Marathon is an annual road running event over the half marathon distance which takes place in November in Boulogne-Billancourt, France.

The event was first organised in 1997 by the Athletic Club de Boulogne-Billancourt. The race steadily increased in size in its first years, attaining 1000 entrants by 2000 and doubling this number three years later. The Fédération française d'athlétisme classed it as a national level race in 2006 and following the participation of 4000 runners from 26 countries, it was raised to international race status the following year.

At the 2008 edition, Kenyan Nicholas Manza ran a race record time of 1:00:12 hours. A year later, Ethiopia's Firehiwot Dado became the first woman to complete the distance in under one hour and ten minutes, setting the women's course record of 1:09:26 hours. The 2011 race was the first run with IAAF Bronze Label Road Race status, marking it as one of the foremost races of its kind.

The course for the race is a looped circuit that starts and finishes at the town hall. It follows a clockwise route along the river Seine, passing the Sèvres - Cité de la céramique, Pont de Saint-Cloud. It heads north towards the Longchamp Racecourse and has a short loop through the Bois de Boulogne, where it reaches the halfway mark. At this point the course loops back on itself and follows the Seine in a southerly direction until it finally ends up at the town hall finish point.

Past winners

Key:

References

External links
Official website

Half marathons in France
Recurring sporting events established in 1997
Sport in Hauts-de-Seine
Annual sporting events in France
1997 establishments in France
Autumn events in France